Sinogastromyzon rugocauda is a species of ray-finned fish in the genus Sinogastromyzon. It is found in the Ma River drainage in Laos and Vietnam. It lives in fast flowing rivers in rapids, clinging on rocks and large stones. It is used in local subsistence fisheries.

References

Sinogastromyzon
Fish of Laos
Fish of Vietnam
Fish described in 1978